Vange is a former village and civil parish now subsumed within the urban area of the Basildon borough of Essex. As it is much smaller than Basildon, Laindon and Pitsea, it does not have its own town centre or railway station. The London Road (B1464) is the main road through Vange and used to be part of the A13 until it was bypassed in the 1970s. The population of the Vange ward within the Basildon Borough taken at the 2011 Census was 10,048. In 1931 the parish had a population of 2300. On 1 January 1937 the parish was abolished to form Billericay.

Vange Marshes is a wetland habitat.

Church

The earliest parts of All Saints Church date from the late 12th century, with alterations from subsequent centuries. The last were in 1837. It is built of stone, flint and other masonry, with bands of brickwork alternating with tufa and rubble walling. A bellcote that was refashioned in 1816 adorns the roof at the west end of the church.

Public houses
The Old Barge Inn (currently closed)
The Five Bells
Tesco Express

External links
 Basildon Heritage
 Basildon Borough History - Vange

References

 

Populated places in Essex
Former civil parishes in Essex
Basildon (town)